Roubidoux Township is a township in Texas County, in the U.S. state of Missouri.

Roubidoux Township was erected in 1845, taking its name from Roubidoux Creek.

References

Townships in Missouri
Townships in Texas County, Missouri